Haryana is one of the 28 states in India, located in the northern part of the country. It is 128 km (approx. 80 miles) from Delhi, the capital of India. The Indian subcontinent has a history of earthquakes. The reason for the intensity and high frequency of shocks caused is due to the Indian plate driving into Asia at a rate of approximately 47 millimetres per year. In 1956, there was a significant earthquake. On May 29, 2020, Atyal of Rohtak was the epicenter of an earthquake.

Earthquakes

See also
 Earthquake zones of India
 Geology of India
 List of aftershocks of April 2015 Nepal earthquake
 Lists of 21st-century earthquakes

References 

Sources

External links
 Earthquake Reports, India Meteorological Department (on line)

 
Earthquake
H
Earthquakes
Disasters in Haryana